Akademischer Ballspiel-Club 1897 Charlottenburg was a German association football club based in the Charlottenburg district of Berlin. Founded on 31 May 1897, it is notable as one of the founding clubs of the German Football Association (Deutscher Fussball Bund or German Football Association) in Leipzig in 1900.

Akademischer BC was established as a separate association out of the Akademischer Sport-Club 1893 Berlin after disputes within the membership of that club. It is believed to have been made up of students from the Technische Hochschule Charlottenburg (Technical College of Charlottenburg). The team played its home matches at the army drill-field known as Kleiner Exerzierplatz in Westend, Malwitzstraße, and wore uniforms made up of dark green jerseys and white shorts.

After a brief turn in the VBB (Verband Berliner Ballspielvereine or Federation of Berlin Ballplay Teams) the club turned to varsity competition and organized the first varsity football championship in the city in 1903. They met Preussen Berlin in the final, defeating them by a score of 2:1. Akademischer SC and Britannia Berlin also took part in the competition.

In addition to its football side the club had departments for athletics, speed skating, and tennis.

References
 DFB Year Book 1904–05

Football clubs in Germany
Defunct football clubs in Germany
Defunct football clubs in Berlin
Association football clubs established in 1897
1897 establishments in Germany